Jeremy Lim Wei Shen (born 27 April 1998) is a Malaysian footballer who plays for Malaysia Super League club Petaling Jaya City as a centre-back.

Jeremy began his football career with PKNP before signed with Petaling Jaya City in 2020. He also played for MIFA in 2019 where his club clinched Piala Emas Raja-Raja in 2019.

References

External links
 

1998 births
Living people
People from Malacca
Malaysian footballers
Petaling Jaya City FC players
PKNP FC players
Malaysia Super League players
Malaysian people of Chinese descent
Association football defenders